Thant Phyu Phyu (born 28 September 1966) is a Burmese judoka. She competed in the women's half-middleweight event at the 1992 Summer Olympics.

References

External links
 

1966 births
Living people
Burmese female judoka
Olympic judoka of Myanmar
Judoka at the 1992 Summer Olympics
Place of birth missing (living people)